Hampea thespesioides is a species of flowering plant in the family Malvaceae. It is endemic to Colombia.

References

thespesioides
Endemic flora of Colombia
Least concern plants
Taxonomy articles created by Polbot